Uygur District is a district of Almaty Region in Kazakhstan. The administrative center of the district is the selo of Chundzha. Population:    Kazakhs 40.6% Uyghurs 57%

Geography
It is located in the southeastern part of the Almaty region in the foothills of the Zailiysky Alatau, between the Ketmen ridge and the plain of the Ili depression.

On the territory of the district there is a relic grove of Sogdian ash - a natural monument of national importance. On the territory of this grove, 34 species of plants listed in the Red Book grow, more than 60 species of mammals, 300 species of birds and more than 20 species of amphibians live.

Another attraction is the Charyn Canyon or the "Valley of Castles".

Between the Ketmen mountains and the valley of the Ili river there are thermal (hot) artesian springs with low-mineralized radon water.

The Uygur District has a wide variety of medicinal herbs, sweet fruits of apricots, apples, grapes and berry crops.

References

Districts of Kazakhstan
Almaty Region